Rugelia nudicaulis (Rugel's Indian plantain or Rugels ragwort), the sole species of the genus Rugelia, blooms in summer.  It is a wildflower endemic to higher elevations in the Great Smoky Mountains. It is a rare species in Tennessee. First placed in the genus Senecio, then moved to Cacalia  it was finally placed in a genus of its own, Rugelia. Genetic diversity in this plant, assessed using allozymes, is so low that the species may not survive changing environmental conditions.

References

Horn, Cathcart, Hemmerly, Duhl, Wildflowers of Tennessee, the Ohio Valley, and the Southern Appalachians, Lone Pine Publishing, (2005) p 372,  

Senecioneae
Monotypic Asteraceae genera
Endemic flora of the United States
Flora of North Carolina
Flora of Tennessee
Natural history of the Great Smoky Mountains
Taxa named by Alvan Wentworth Chapman
Taxa named by Robert J. Shuttleworth